The 2017 McDonald's All-American Boys Game was an All-star basketball game that was played on Wednesday, March 29, 2017 at the United Center in Chicago, Illinois, home of the Chicago Bulls. The game's rosters features the best and most highly recruited high school boys graduating in 2017. The game is the 40th annual version of the McDonald's All-American Game first played in 1977.

The 24 players are selected from 2,500 nominees by a committee of basketball experts. They are chosen not only for their on-court skills but for their performances off the court as well.

Rosters

When the rosters were announced on January 15, 2017, Kentucky had four selectees, while Duke and UCLA both had two. On the eve of the game, March 28, 2017, six players remained undecided. Of these six, four would choose their school within the next two months - Mo Bamba committed to Texas under coach Shaka Smart, Brandon McCoy elected to play for UNLV, Trevon Duval chose Duke, and Kevin Knox decided to join Kentucky. 

Michael Porter Jr. earned the MVP award after leading his Team West to a close win with 17 points. Originally committed to the University of Washington, he decommitted after the firing of head coach Lorenzo Romar and instead chose to represent his home state by playing for the University of Missouri.

Team East

† On September 17, Robinson left Western Kentucky announcing he will prepare for the NBA and will not play college basketball.

Team West

‡ , Bowen is suspended and not allowed to participate in team activities, although he is still listed on the team's roster and is reportedly still enrolled as a student.

^undecided at the time of roster selection
~undecided at game time
Reference

Box Score

References

Basketball competitions in Chicago
2017 in sports in Illinois
2016–17 in American basketball
Basketball in Illinois
2017